Charlotte of Orléans or Charlotte d'Orléans can refer to:
 Elizabeth Charlotte, Madame Palatine (1652–1722), the second wife of Philippe I, Duke of Orléans
 Charlotte Aglaé d'Orléans (1700–1761), the third daughter of Philippe II, Duke of Orléans